Mir Azizi, also rendered as Mirazi, may refer to:
 Mir Azizi, Eslamabad-e Gharb
 Mir Azizi-ye Qadim, Kermanshah County
 Mir Azizi, Ravansar
 Mir Azizi, Sahneh